Beacon Island, also known as Batavia's graveyard, is an island on the eastern side of the Wallabi Group at the northern end of the Houtman Abrolhos, in the Indian Ocean, off the coast of Western Australia.

Description 
The surface is mostly sandy but has some pockets of guano and some exposed coral.

History 
The island is best known as the location of the  wreck and mutiny. Batavia was wrecked on Morning Reef in June 1629. Most of the 316 passengers and crew were washed ashore on the smaller islands on the eastern side of the Wallabi Group. The commander, Francisco Pelsaert, and 47 other crew and passengers set off in one the longboats in search of water but ended up sailing to Indonesia.

When Pelsaert returned to the Abrolhos, he found that Batavias under-merchant, Jeronimus Cornelisz, had recruited other men from the survivors and then killed 125 of the other survivors. The mutineers camped on Beacon Island, and many of the victims were buried there.

The island, along with the rest of the Abrolhos, was likely visited by sealers and guano miners through the 19th century. In 1877, survivors of the Hadda shipwreck lived on the island for five days. Crayfisherman arrived on the island sometime afterward and established several galvanised iron and asbestos shacks along with sheds for gear on four main sites. The first archaeological excavations were conducted in the 1960s and 1970s, with the Western Australian Museum conducting excavations in 1992.

In 2014, buildings and structures were removed from the island to restore it to a state of wilderness as part of an effort to protect Batavia heritage.

The island is on the National Heritage list due to it being the site to the Batavia shipwreck.

Birds 
The island is part of the Houtman Abrolhos Important Bird Area, identified as such by BirdLife International because it supports large numbers of breeding seabirds. Birds that are found on the island include the wedge-tailed shearwater, which nests on the island between November and May.

Notes

References

Australian National Heritage List
Batavia (1628 ship)
Important Bird Areas of Western Australia
Islands of the Houtman Abrolhos
Wallabi Group